Free-minded Party (from , ,  and ) may refer to one of several defunct liberal parties:

German Free-minded Party, a political party in Germany from 1884 to 1893
Free-minded Union, a successor party to the German Free-minded Party from 1893 to 1910
Free-minded People's Party, a successor party to the German Free-minded Party  from 1893 to 1910
Free-minded Democratic Party (German name), a political party in Switzerland from 1894 to 2009
The abbreviation FDP is still used by their successor FDP.The Liberals, a political party in Switzerland from 2009
Free-minded Democratic League, a political party in the Netherlands from 1901 to 1946
Free-minded National Association, a political party in Sweden from 1902 to 1934
Free-minded Liberal Party (Free-minded People's Party from 1932), a political party in Norway from 1909 to 1945
Free-minded League, a political party in Finland from 1951 to 1965
Freeminded Co-operation, a political party on the Åland Islands from 1967 to 2011